Frequency illusion, also known as the Baader–Meinhof phenomenon or frequency bias, is a cognitive bias in which, after noticing something for the first time, there is a tendency to notice it more often, leading someone to believe that it has an increased frequency of occurrence. It occurs when increased awareness of something creates the illusion that it is appearing more often. Put plainly, the frequency illusion occurs when "a concept or thing you just found out about suddenly seems to pop up everywhere."

Working memory and frequency illusions
It is essential to note that specific concepts may show up more often or multiple times a day. This would equate to confirmation bias. An individual’s selective attention is the first step in noticing something due to it becoming important in your everyday life. According to David A. Lieberman, the British Associations mention that the strength of any association depends on the intensity of the stimuli involved. Furthermore, Frequency Illusion is a perception that something you’ve been exposed to suddenly seems more frequent in your environment than it was before. 

To add to the discussion, the visuo-spatial sketchpad can hold visual material while also retrieving information from long-term memory. To recognize the frequency illusion, one must process it through working memory. Specifically, the visuo-spatial sketchpad along with the phonological loop and central executive. An individual’s selective attention is the first step in noticing something due to it becoming important in your everyday life. Studies have shown that the associations involving emotional or traumatic events have been found to be better remembered.

History 
The name "Baader–Meinhof phenomenon" was derived from a particular instance of frequency illusion in which the Baader–Meinhof Group was mentioned. In this instance, it was noticed by a man named Terry Mullen, who in 1994 wrote a letter to a newspaper column in which he mentioned that he had first heard of the Baader–Meinhof Group, and shortly thereafter coincidentally came across the term from another source. After the story was published, various readers submitted letters detailing their own experiences of similar events, and the name "Baader–Meinhof phenomenon" was coined as a result.

The term "frequency illusion" was coined in 2005 by Arnold Zwicky, a professor of linguistics at Stanford University and Ohio State University. Arnold Zwicky considered this illusion a process involving two cognitive biases: selective attention bias (noticing things that are important to us and disregarding the rest) followed by confirmation bias (looking for things that support our hypotheses while disregarding potential counter-evidence). It is considered mostly harmless, but can cause worsening symptoms in patients with schizophrenia. The frequency illusion may also have legal implications, as eyewitness accounts and memory can be influenced by this illusion.

Oliver Sacks noted that he started noticing numerous people with Tourette syndrome only after he first came across the term.

Examples
CD Denver (2019) explains how Frequency Illusion can have serious consequences. An individual’s exposure to frequency Illusion could help solve a problem or activate a sense of delusion and worry. “If a detective trying to solve a crime becomes aware, through the Frequency Illusion, of a certain suspect, then the detective’s mind is prepared to pay attention to that suspect when new information comes up that’s relevant.” CD Denver (2019)

See also 
 Availability cascade
 Chronostasis
 List of cognitive biases 
 Recency illusion
 Synchronicity
 Working memory

References 

Cognitive biases